Death Canyon is located in Grand Teton National Park, in the U.S. state of Wyoming. The canyon was formed by glaciers which retreated at the end of the last glacial maximum approximately 15,000 years ago, leaving behind a U-shaped valley. At the base of the canyon is Phelps Lake which was created by glacial activity. The Death Canyon Trail extends the length of the canyon to Fox Creek Pass, at which point the Death Canyon Shelf, a relative narrow and level plateau, can be traversed. The canyon has many Whitebark Pine stands, particularly near the tree line. At the junction of the Death Canyon and the Alaska Basin trails, the historic Death Canyon Barn is preserved after being listed on the National Register of Historic Places in 1998.

See also
Canyons of the Teton Range
Geology of the Grand Teton area

References

Canyons and gorges of Grand Teton National Park